Para is a village is southwestern Ivory Coast. It is in the sub-prefecture of Djouroutou, Tabou Department, San-Pédro Region, Bas-Sassandra District.

Para was a commune from October 2005until March 2012, when it became one of 1126 communes nationwide that were abolished.

History
Following the disputed November 2010 election, there were armed attacks near Para across the Liberian border by disaffected Ivorian soldiers and their Liberian comrades. In June 2012 these attacks intensified when seven United Nations peacekeepers, an Ivorian soldier, and at least ten civilians were killed in the nearby village of Saho on 8 June. Over 7,000 refugees flooded into Para.

Economy
Cacao is the main cash crop in the Para area.

Notes

Former communes of Ivory Coast
Populated places in Bas-Sassandra District
Populated places in San-Pédro Region